Englabörn is the first full length studio album by Icelandic musician Jóhann Jóhannsson, released by Touch Music in 2002. Music included on Englabörn was composed for a play by Hávar Sigurjónsson and was played by string quartet, percussionists and Jóhansson himself on several instruments. The album consists of mostly short pieces combining classical, ambient and electronic influences.

Critical reception

The album received critical acclaim, gaining 8.9 rating from Pitchfork Media on initial review.

Track listing

Personnel
Credits for Englabörn adapted from Allmusic.
 Aron Þór Árnason – mixing
 Ethos String Quartet – string quartet
 Viðar Hákon Gíslason – engineer, mixing, recording
 Greta Guðnadóttir – group member, violin
 Matthías Hemstock – percussion
 Jóhann Jóhannsson – arranger, composer, electronics, glockenspiel, harmonium, organ, piano, producer
 Gudmundur Kristmundsson – group member, string quartet
 Jon Wozencroft – photography

References

External links
 
 

2002 albums
Electronic albums by Icelandic artists
Jóhann Jóhannsson albums